A Door into Ocean is a 1986 feminist science fiction novel by Joan Slonczewski. The novel's themes include ecofeminism and nonviolent revolution, as well as Slonczewski's own knowledge in the field of biology.

Premise
The novel is set in the future, on the fictional planet of Shora, a moon covered by water. The inhabitants of this planet, known as Sharers, are all female. Sharers use genetic engineering to control the ecology of their planet. They are peaceful beings who "share" — that is, they have a spiritual and linguistic union with each other and treat everyone equally. The Sharers take egalitarianism for granted because they share and they lack the concept of "power-over", making their society one in which conflicts are settled without violence. When they are being threatened by an outside power, they resist nonviolently because they refuse to believe in power. Thus, the Sharers can never be subdued by force.

The Sharer way of nonviolence is more than spiritual. It is based on historical realities of nonviolent resistance. The author based the events of their novel on much historical research, particularly the writings of peace historian Gene Sharp. The novel includes much biological research into the evolution of innate capacities for nonviolence. For example, the participation of children in nonviolent resistance draws on deep instinctual responses found in humans and related mammals.

Plot 
At the beginning of the novel, the Sharers are all female. But as they encounter a non-Sharer community from another planet, which threatens them, the Sharer Merwen realizes that they must find out whether other kinds of "people" can share their life or not. Merwen goes to the other planet, Valedon, to recruit a young man, Spinel, to return to Shora and attempt to learn their ways. This venture leads to disagreement within the Sharer community (they have plenty of disagreements, though addressed without violence). With many false starts, Spinel gradually learns the Sharer way, as a man; and ultimately he works with the Sharers to help them defend their planet from a military invasion.

Language 
A unique expression of the Sharer way is their language, in which subject and object are interchangeable. The Sharers know by context what subject and object are—but their language does not allow them to make a distinction. As a result, they always know that what one person "forces" upon another can always go the other way. Their language impedes anyone from "giving orders" to dominate others. For example, if a stranger says, "You must obey me," the Sharer hears, "I must obey you," or (the closest translation), "We must share agreement." Their language reinforces the Sharers' inability to accept any situation in which one individual dominates another by force.

The Sharer worldview extends to their environment, their surrounding ecosystem. They cannot act upon their plants and animals without being acted upon in return. So, for example, because Sharers consume plants and animals as food, they accept the fact that they in turn will become food for other life forms; that predators will ultimately consume them.

Even the language's verbs enforce the Sharer's beliefs. All verbs "embed the notion of reciprocity in every action" says Vint, who gives the verb examples, “learnsharing, worksharing, lovesharing” (37).  The verb "hitsharing" is also an example because the verb is described as hitting a rock, which will hit back in turn, because of the vibrations one feels on their arms.

Characters 

 Merwen
 Usha
 Spinel
 Uriel
 Lystra
 Berenice
 Realgar
 Malachite
 Siderite
 Yinevra

Literary significance and reception
The 1985 Library Journal review highly recommended this novel, saying "Slonczewski creates an all-female nonviolent culture that reaches beyond feminism to a new definition of human nature".

Awards and nominations 
 A Door into Ocean won the 1987 John W. Campbell Memorial Award for Best Science Fiction Novel
 It was a nominee for the 1987 Prometheus Award for Best Novel

Publication history
 1986, USA, Arbor House, February 1986, Hardcover
 1987, USA, Avon Books, February 1987, Paperback
 1987, UK, Women's Press, June 1987, Paperback
 2000, USA, Orb Books, October 2000, Paperback

References

External links
 Joan Slonczewski site
 Illustrated guide to A Door into Ocean
 

1986 novels
1986 science fiction novels
Feminist science fiction novels
John W. Campbell Award for Best Science Fiction Novel-winning works
Novels with lesbian themes
LGBT speculative fiction novels
Arbor House books
Underwater novels
Novels about genetic engineering